Jawar Mohammed (born 12 May 1986) is an Ethiopian political analyst and activist. One of the founders of the Oromia Media Network (OMN), Jawar was a leading organizer of the 2014–2016 Oromo protests. He has been credited with toppling the incumbent government in February 2018 and helping Abiy Ahmed to power.

Early life and education
Jawar Mohammed was born on 12 May 1986 in the Dhumuga, Arsi Province bordering Hararghe. His father was Arsi Oromo, of Muslim faith, while his mother was Tulama Oromo, an Orthodox Christian; the inter-religious union was novel but gained acceptance within the community.

Jawar began his formal education at a Catholic school in Asella. He attended secondary school in Adama until 2003, when he was awarded a scholarship to study at the United World College of South East Asia in Singapore, from which he graduated in 2005. He described his experience at the UWC as awakening his consciousness to his own Oromo identity. He graduated from Stanford University in 2009 with a degree in political science, and acquired a Master's in human rights from Columbia University, in 2012.

Legal issues
On 30 June 2020, Jawar along with Bekele Gerba, Eskinder Nega and Sintayew Chekol were arrested by government amidst a riot sparked after singer Hachalu Hundessa murder. They were charged with terrorism in context of "inciting violence" at the crackdown. On On 5 February 2021, the Ethiopian Human Rights Commission (EHRC) Chief Commissioner Daniel Bekele said that "very close supervision is required to prevent any grave threat to their health and life and that reasonably justified demands of the prisoners must be addressed" following reports indicating their health condition deterioration and undergoing hunger strike at prison.

On 7 January 2022, the Ethiopian government announced it would release several political prisoners including Jawar, stating it was "to pave the way for a lasting solution to Ethiopia’s problems in a peaceful, non-violent way" through a “national dialogue”.

References

External links
 Official Jawar Mohammed Facebook

1986 births
Living people
People from Oromia Region
Ethiopian journalists
Ethiopian activists
Ethiopian politicians
Stanford University alumni
Columbia University alumni
Hunger strikers
Ethiopian emigrants to the United States
People educated at a United World College
Oromo politicians